Seurat is a surname. Notable people with the surname include:

 Georges Seurat (1859–1891), French painter
 Léon Gaston Seurat (1872–?), French zoologist and parasitologist
 Marie Seurat (born 1949), Syrian novelist
 Michel Seurat (1947–1986), French sociologist and researcher
 Pilar Seurat (1938–2001), Filipina-American actress